This is an alphabetical  list of corporate directors  of Yahoo!,past:

Current board members
As of December 19, 2016
 Tor Braham (2016) – managing director and global head of technology, mergers and acquisitions at Deutsche Bank Securities
 Eric Brandt
David Filo (2014) – co-founder, chief Yahoo and director, Yahoo Inc.!
 Eddy Hartenstein (2016) – non-executive chairman of the board of directors at Tronc 
Richard Hill – chairman of the board of directors at Tessera Technologies
 Catherine J. Friedman
 Vinny Lingham – co-founder & CEO at Civic
 Marissa Mayer (2012) – CEO, Yahoo! Inc.
 Thomas J. McInerney (2012) – former executive vice president and chief financial officer, IAC/InterActiveCorp
 Charles R. Schwab (2014) – chairman of Charles Schwab Corporation.
 Jane E. Shaw (2014) – retired chairman of the board at Intel Corporation
 Jeffrey Smith (2016) – chief executive officer & chief investment officer at Starboard Value
 Maynard Webb (2012) – chairman, Yahoo, founder, Webb Investment Network and chairman and former CEO of LiveOps

Past board members

Alfred Amoroso
Carol Bartz
Frank Biondi
Roy J. Bostock
Patti Hart
Eric Hippeau
Sue James (2010) – retired partner, Ernst & Young
Vyomesh Joshi
David Kenny (executive)
Timothy Koogle
Robert Kotick
Max Levchin (2012) – chairman and CEO, HVF, LLC
Peter Liguori
Daniel S. Loeb
Jeff Mallett
Marissa Mayer
Thomas J. McInerney
Jonathan Miller (businessman)
 H. Lee Scott, Jr. (2014) – retired president and chief executive officer Wal-Mart Stores
Brad D. Smith
Scott Thompson (businessman)
 Maynard Webb (2012) – chairman, Yahoo, founder, Webb Investment Network and chairman and former CEO of LiveOps
Gary L. Wilson
Harry Wilson (businessman)
Michael Wolf
Jerry Yang

References

Yahoo directors